Andrew Vaughan Nelson (born May 27, 1933) is a former American football safety in the National Football League for the Baltimore Colts and New York Giants.   He currently owns and runs a small BBQ establishment, Andy Nelson's Barbecue.

Early life
Andy was born in Athens, Alabama, where his father Guy was chief pitmaster for Limestone County. He was a four-sport athlete at Athens High School playing football, basketball, track and baseball, serving as co-captain of the 1951 team and winning letters for each of his four years he completed. Nelson played quarterback and defensive back for then Memphis State University. A four-year letterman (1952–1956), he gained All-American recognition in his senior season.  In 1956, he led the Tigers to their first-ever bowl game, the Burley Bowl in Johnson City, Tennessee, where they were victorious over East Tennessee State.

Professional career
Nelson was drafted by the Baltimore Colts in the eleventh round of the 1957 NFL Draft.  Having played both quarterback and defensive back in college, the Colts made him a defensive player.  Nelson started 12 games his rookie season, with 5 interceptions for 29 yards. The following season, Nelson would record 8 interceptions for 199 yards and 1 touchdown. The Colts would go on to win the NFL Championship in what was the NFL's first sudden-death overtime game and has since become widely known as "The Greatest Game Ever Played". The Colts would repeat in 1959 and over his seven-year career with the Colts, Nelson would rack up 33 total interceptions for 378 yards and 3 touchdowns.  The Colts traded Nelson to the  New York Giants for the 1964 season, his last in the NFL.

Coaching career
Nelson spent two years as a player and defensive coach with the Harrisburg Capitols of the Atlantic Coast Football League, the Colts' farm team, where he led the league in pass defense before going on to be named the head football coach. Nelson went on to become Defensive Coordinator for the Norfolk Neptunes, winning a league championship in 1971, and then the Chambersburg Cardinals of the Seaboard Football League, winning another championship in 1973. Nelson was also defensive coordinator for Philadelphia Bell in the World Football League from 1974–75.

Awards
Nelson was voted into the Limestone County Hall of Fame (2003) in Alabama  and the Memphis State Hall of Fame (1976). He was selected to the NFL's All-Pro team in 1958 and 1959, and the NFL's Pro Bowl in 1960. He was selected by Sporting News for their 1st-Team All-NFL in 1958, 1959 and 1960.

Family life
Nelson has seven children.  His children mostly run the barbecue business today.  Many consider it the Baltimore region's best.  The restaurant dining areas are lined with Best of Baltimore magazine covers and other awards.  There are also numerous football mementos and photos, and various figurines and posters of pigs.

References

1933 births
Living people
People from Athens, Alabama
Players of American football from Alabama
American football safeties
Memphis Tigers football players
Baltimore Colts players
New York Giants players
Western Conference Pro Bowl players